The 1997 Heineken Trophy was a tennis tournament played on grass courts in Rosmalen, 's-Hertogenbosch in the Netherlands that was part of the World Series of the 1996 ATP Tour and of Tier III of the 1997 WTA Tour. The tournament was held from 16 June 16 until 22 June 1997. Richard Krajicek and Ruxandra Dragomir won the singles titles.

Finals

Men's singles

 Richard Krajicek defeated  Guillaume Raoux 6–4, 7–6(9–7)
 It was Krajicek's 3rd title of the year and the 16th of his career.

Women's singles

 Ruxandra Dragomir defeated  Miriam Oremans 5–7, 6–2, 6–4
 It was Dragomir's 1st title of the year and the 6th of her career.

Men's doubles
 Jacco Eltingh /  Paul Haarhuis defeated  Trevor Kronemann /  David Macpherson 6–4, 7–5
 It was Eltingh's 3rd title of the year and the 35th of his career. It was Haarhuis' 3rd title of the year and the 34th of his career.

Women's doubles

 Eva Melicharová /  Helena Vildová defeated  Karina Habšudová /  Florencia Labat 6–3, 7–6(8–6)
 It was Melicharova's 1st title of the year and the 1st of her career. It was Vildova's 1st title of the year and the 1st of her career.

External links
 
 ATP tournament profile
 WTA tournament profile

Heineken Trophy
Heineken Trophy
Rosmalen Grass Court Championships
1997 in Dutch tennis